Constituency NA-204 (Larkana-I) was a constituency for the National Assembly of Pakistan. It was abolished in the 2018 delimitation after the overlap between the constituencies of Larkana District and Qambar Shahdadkot District was undone. Now the two districts have separate constituencies: NA-200 (Larkana-I), NA-201 (Larkana-II), NA-202 (Qambar Shahdadkot-I), and NA-203 (Qambar Shahdadkot-II). And the area of the former NA-204 is divided between NA-200 and NA-201.

Election 2002 

General elections were held on 10 October 2002. Muhammad Anwar Bhutto of the PPP won by 46,743 votes.

Election 2008 

General elections were held on 18 February 2008. Shahid Hussain Bhutto of the PPP won by 81,439 votes.

Election 2013 

General elections were held on 11 May 2013. Mohammad Ayaz Soomro of the PPP won by 50,128 votes and became a  member of National Assembly. On December 27, 2016, Soomro announced his resignation from the National Assembly to pave the way for Bilawal Bhutto Zardari to run for the seat.

References

External links 
Election results official website

NA-204
Abolished National Assembly Constituencies of Pakistan